Parmila Tokas is an Indian politician and is member of the Sixth Legislative Assembly of Delhi and Seventh Legislative Assembly of Delhi. She is a member of the Aam Aadmi Party and represents R K Puram (Assembly constituency) of Delhi.

Early life and education
Parmila Tokas was born in Dhansa village in Delhi. Her highest attained educational qualification is HSC from Government Sarvodaya Girls Senior Secondary School, Dhansa. Tokas is a businessperson by profession. In 2013, her husband Dheeraj Kumar Tokas had contest from the same constituency but lost the election.

Political career
Parmila Tokas is a member of the Aam Aadmi Party. Her term as MLA in the Sixth Legislative Assembly of Delhi is her first term. She defeated Anil Kumar Sharma of BJP by a margin of 19,068 votes in the 2015 Delhi Legislative Assembly elections. She represents R K Puram (Assembly constituency) of Delhi.

On 22 December 2015, a complaint was filed by a Central Public Works Department, India worker against Tokas and her husband for an alleged assault against the worker in which several members of the AAP's women's wing took part.

MLA
From   2015 she was Member, Sixth Legislative Assembly of Delhi.

Member of Legislative Assembly (2020 - present)
Since 2020, she is an elected member of the 7th Delhi Assembly.

Committee assignments of Delhi Legislative Assembly
 Member (2022-2023), Committee on Government Undertakings

See also

 Sixth Legislative Assembly of Delhi
 Delhi Legislative Assembly
 Government of India
 Politics of India
 Aam Aadmi Party

Electoral performance

References 

People from New Delhi
Delhi MLAs 2015–2020
Delhi MLAs 2020–2025
Women members of the Delhi Legislative Assembly
21st-century Indian women politicians
21st-century Indian politicians
People from South West Delhi district
Businesswomen from Delhi
Living people
Year of birth missing (living people)
Aam Aadmi Party MLAs from Delhi